Simbari may refer to:

Simbari Anga, the Sambia people
Simbari language
Nicola Simbari (1927-2012), Italian painter

See also
Simbari Khaleh, Iran

Surnames of Italian origin